Abdallah Gomaa (born 10 January 1996) is an Egyptian professional footballer who plays as a left-back for Egyptian Premier League club Zamalek and the Egypt national team.

Club career
On 11 December 2014, it was announced that Gomaa's contract with Union Berlin had been dissolved. Club officials stated that he had shown hints of great potential, however due to language problems working with him had been difficult.

International career
Gomaa made his debut for the Egypt national football team on 14 October 2019 in a friendly against Botswana.

International

Honours
Zamalek

Egyptian Premier League 2020-21, 2021-22

Egypt Cup: 2017–18, 2018–2019 , 2021
Egyptian Super Cup: 2019–20
Saudi-Egyptian Super Cup: 2018
CAF Confederation Cup: 2018–19
 CAF Super Cup: 2020

References

External links
 
 
 

1996 births
Living people
Egyptian footballers
Egypt international footballers
Egyptian expatriate footballers
Expatriate footballers in Germany
ENPPI SC players
1. FC Union Berlin players
2. Bundesliga players
Association football midfielders
Egyptian Premier League players
Al Masry SC players
Zamalek SC players
People from North Sinai Governorate